Tevita Toloi is a Fijian professional rugby league footballer who plays as a  forward. He has played for Fiji at international level.

Background
Toloi was born in Macuata, Fiji. He grew up in Rockhampton, Queensland and played his junior rugby league for the Yeppoon Seagulls. He attended Wavell State High School before being signed by the Newcastle Knights.

Playing career

Club career
Toloi was contracted to the Newcastle Knights in the NRL.

International career
In October 2022 Toloi was named in the Fiji squad for the 2021 Rugby League World Cup.

In October 2022 he made his international début for the Fiji Bati side against Scotland.

References

External links
Rakaviti profile
Fiji profile

Living people
Rugby league second-rows
Fijian rugby league players
Fiji national rugby league team players
2002 births